The Kingittorsuaq Runestone (old spelling: Kingigtorssuaq), listed as GR 1 in the Rundata catalog, is a runestone that was found on Kingittorsuaq Island, an island in the Upernavik Archipelago in northwestern Greenland.

Description
The Kingittorsuaq Runestone was found in 1824 in a group of three cairns that formed an equilateral triangle on top of the mountain on Kingittorsuaq Island in the south-central part of the Upernavik Archipelago. The stone is now located at the National Museum of Denmark in Copenhagen.

The stone has been dated to the Middle Ages. The Catholic Encyclopedia states the date as April 25, 1135. William Thalbitzer dates the stone to 1314 using pentadic numerals. Others have dated the stone between 1250 and 1333. However, as the historian Finn Gad has pointed out, the date given on the stone can be interpreted in various ways. As such, it cannot, as previously thought, be taken as evidence for the three hunters named on the stone in this region.

The last part of the runic inscription is not transcribed as it is composed of unknown characters; some believe that they are meaningless, while others believe that it contains a secret message.

Inscription 
Latin transliteration of the text on the runestone:

el=likr * sikuaþs : so=n:r * ok * baan=ne : torta=r son : ok enriþi * os son : laukardak*in : fyrir * gakndag hloþu * ua=rda te * ok rydu : (followed by six unknown characters) 

Old Norse transcription:

Erlingr Sigvatssonr ok Bjarni Þórðarson og Eindriði Oddsson laugardaginn fyrir gangdag hlóðu varða þessa ok ryðu...

English translation:

Erlingur the son of Sigvat and Bjarni Þorðar's son and Eindriði Oddr's son, the washingday (Saturday) before Rogation Day, raised this mound and rode...

Undeciphered Runes 
The six runes following the translated text are undeciphered, though they do have very close single-character components.
The first two and final runes appear to have two components,
a Sowilō (ᛋ) with a Mannaz (ᛘ) and/or Algiz (ᛉ) on the top and bottom.
The following three runes appear also to have the top and bottom Mannaz or Algiz, just with a Jēran (ᛄ) instead.

See also 
 1824 in archaeology
 Greenlandic Norse
 List of runestones
 Catholic Encyclopedia
 Cipher runes

References

External links 
 Pre-Columbian Discovery of America
 Runic inscription from Greenland (Text only in )
 Vikings in Greenland from MNSU EMuseum

History of Greenland
Runestones
Runestones in Denmark
Upernavik Archipelago